Edmund Burke "Doc" Nagle (August 10, 1893 – June 24, 1966) was a Canadian professional ice hockey player, born in Ottawa. He played with the Saskatoon Sheiks of the Western Canada Hockey League.

Biography
Nagle was a dentist, hence his nickname "Doc".

An all-around athlete, he competed in football, ice hockey, track and field and baseball as a student at the University of Ottawa.

Nagle received his dental education at the University of Pittsburgh. While in that city, he played amateur hockey for the Pittsburgh Athletic Association and was elected captain of the team at the beginning of the 1919–20 season. Roy Schooley, who assembled the very first U.S. Olympic ice hockey team in 1920, said he would have named Nagle to the roster had Nagle been eligible to compete for the U.S.

Nagle coached multiple sports for many years in Saskatoon and Battleford, including football at the University of Saskatchewan.

He died on an ocean cruiser outside of San Francisco in 1966, aged 72.

References

External links

1893 births
1966 deaths
Canadian ice hockey right wingers
Ice hockey people from Ottawa
Pittsburgh Athletic Association ice hockey players
Saskatoon Sheiks players
Canadian expatriates in the United States
University of Pittsburgh alumni